The Sir Patrick Sheehy Professor of International Relations is a  professorship at the University of Cambridge, named after Patrick Sheehy, former chairman of British-American Tobacco. It was established in 1996 amid criticism concerning the University of Cambridge acceptance of funding from the tobacco industry.

List of professors 
 1997–2004 James B.L. Mayall, during which time the professorship was assigned to the Faculty of History
 2004–2016 Christopher J. Hill, during which time the professorship was assigned to the Centre of International Studies
 2017- Jason Sharman, formerly Professor of Political Science at Griffith University, Brisbane, Australia.

References 

International Relations, Sheehy, Sir Patrick
Faculty of Human, Social, and Political Science, University of Cambridge
International Relations, Sheehy, Sir Patrick
1996 establishments in England